This RNA modification databases are a compilation of databases and web portals and servers used for RNA modification. RNA modification occurs in all living organisms, and is one of the most evolutionarily conserved properties of RNAs. More than 100 different types of RNA modifications have been characterized across all living organisms. It can affect the activity, localization as well as stability of RNAs, and has been linked with human cancer and diseases.

RNA Modification Databases

References

Genetics databases
RNA splicing
Medical databases